IMG International Tour Tennis is a video game developed by High Score and published by Electronic Arts for the Sega Genesis.

Gameplay
IMG International Tour Tennis is a game that includes 17 stops for the tour and features 4 playing surfaces, and allows the player to choose from 32 professional tennis players.

Reception
Next Generation reviewed the game, rating it three stars out of five, and stated that "Sim fans should go with IMG, and action fans should pick up ATP."

Reviews
Mega #24 (1994 September)
GamePro (Dec, 1994)
Video Games & Computer Entertainment - Nov, 1994
Mean Machines - Oct, 1994
All Game Guide - 1998

References

1994 video games
Electronic Arts games
High Score Productions games
Sega Genesis games
Sega Genesis-only games
Tennis video games
Video games developed in the United States